Lophocampa subfasciata is a moth of the family Erebidae. It was described by Rothschild in 1910. It is found in Paraguay.

References

 Natural History Museum Lepidoptera generic names catalog

subfasciata
Moths described in 1910